The 1998 Conference USA men's basketball tournament was held March 4–7 at the Myrl H. Shoemaker Center in Cincinnati, Ohio.

Top-seeded Cincinnati defeated UNC Charlotte in the championship game, 71–57, to clinch their second Conference USA men's tournament championship.

The Bearcats, in turn, received an automatic bid to the 1998 NCAA tournament. They were joined in the tournament by fellow C-USA members UNC Charlotte and Saint Louis, who earned at-large bids.

Format
Prior to the season, Conference USA dropped their old regular season scheduling format of three divisions of four teams (Red, White, and Blue) in favor of two six-team divisions (American and National). Teams were largely divided based on geography. 

However, since division standings were not utilized for seeding teams in the conference tournament, no changes were made to the tournament format from the previous year. The top four teams were given byes into the quarterfinal round, and the remaining eight teams were entered into the preliminary round. All seeds were determined by overall regular season conference records.

Bracket

References

Conference USA men's basketball tournament
Tournament
Conference USA men's basketball tournament
Conference USA men's basketball tournament